National Electoral Council may refer to:
National Electoral Council of Ecuador
National Electoral Council of Colombia
National Electoral Council of Venezuela